The Rio Tinto Alcan Planetarium is the successor to the Montreal Planetarium, and is located in the Espace pour la Vie, near the Olympic Stadium and the Biodome in Montreal, Quebec, Canada. The new installation has two separate theatres as well as exhibits on space and astronomy. It was officially opened in April 2013.

The building, designed by Cardin + Ramirez et Associés, Architectes, is certified as LEED Platinum.

History 

The Rio Tinto Alcan Planetarium is the successor to the Montréal Planetarium, formerly known as the Dow Planetarium, which operated from April 1, 1966 to October 10, 2011.

The Dow Planetarium was sponsored by Dow Breweries, which later became O'Keefe Breweries, now a part of Molson Breweries. Important in the brewery's decision to found a planetarium was Pierre Gendron, a past professor of chemistry and amateur astronomer who was the founding dean of the Faculty of Science at the University of Ottawa. Gendron was also president of the board of directors of Dow Breweries. It was Gendron's influence that led to Dow's decision to endow Montréal with a planetarium in time for Expo 67.

The planetarium was constructed at Chaboillez Square, a former parking lot outside downtown Montréal. It was designed by the architectural firm of David-Barott-Boulva and constructed at a cost of $1.2 million. The building and projection equipment were completed in February 1966, and the inaugural show, New Skies for a New City, premiered on April 4, 1966.

Between 1966 and 2011, some six million spectators attended over 250 original productions created by the planetarium. Some 50 lecturers and educators presented more than 58,000 shows in the Star Theatre.

The Montréal Planetarium ceased its public activities on October 10, 2011.

Rio Tinto Alcan Planetarium 

The new planetarium is part of the Space for Life (French: Espace pour la vie) museum complex, a cluster of museums focusing on nature. Sustainable development is a focus for the Space for Life, as reflected in the planetarium's architecture and its status as a LEED Platinum certified building. Constructed of aluminum and concrete, the building contains an exhibition area and two dome theatres named "Chaos" and "Milky Way". Artistic direction was by Michel Lemieux and Victor Pilon.

Visitors choose one of two programs, then view two presentations, one in each theatre. One presentation focuses on the science of astronomy while the other presents a more artistic view of space. There is also an exhibition area with exhibits on meteorites and an area, Exo, which uses touchscreen panels to discuss the origin of life and the possibility of life on other worlds (exobiology). All exhibits and presentations are in French and English.

Shows 

A 40-minute presentation about the aurora borealis, Aurōrae, combines images of the Northern Lights with music and live commentary by the planetarium's science interpreters. The origin of the phenomenon is described. A team from the planetarium gathered over 179,000 images in March 2015 in Yellowknife. At that location, light pollution is low and the aurora is visible, on average, 240 nights per year.

Other films shown at the planetarium, some presented with live commentary, include the American Museum of Natural History's Dark Universe and National Geographic's Asteroid: Extreme Mission.

See also
 Nicolaus Copernicus Monument, Montreal

External links
 Rio Tinto Alcan Planetarium - official site

Mercier–Hochelaga-Maisonneuve
Museums established in 2013
Museums in Montreal
Planetaria in Canada
Science museums in Canada